Jeremy Harding (born 1952) is a British writer and journalist, based in the south of France.

Life and work
Harding was born in London, where he was given up for adoption at 11 days old by his Irish mother. He grew up in West London. He tells the story of his adoption and the search for his biological mother in the book Mother Country: Memoir of an Adopted Boy.

He is a contributing editor at the London Review of Books. He lives in France, an hour from Bordeaux, with his wife and three sons.

Publications

Publications by Harding
Small Wars, Small Mercies: Journeys in Africa's Disputed Nations. London: Penguin, 1993. .
The Fate of Africa: Trial by Fire. New York: Simon & Schuster, 1993. .
The Uninvited: Refugees at the Rich Man's Gate (2000)
Mother Country: Memoir of an Adopted Boy (2006)
Border Vigils: Keeping Migrants Out of the Rich World (2012)

Publications with contributions by Harding
Arthur Rimbaud: Selected Poems and Letters. Penguin Classics. London: Penguin, 2004. . Translated by Harding and John Sturrock.

References

Journalists from London
Writers from London
British journalists
British writers
Alumni of the University of Cambridge
Living people
1952 births
British people of Irish descent
English people of Irish descent
English emigrants to France